"Alone (Why Must I Be Alone)" is a popular song written by Morty Craft with lyrics written by Craft's wife, Selma. .

Original recordings
Craft owned a record label, and produced the recording by The Shepherd Sisters on that label.  While it was the only hit for The Shepherd Sisters in the United States reaching No. 18 on the Billboard chart, on November 11, 1957. in the United Kingdom  The Shepherd Sisters' version also charted in the UK, reaching No. 14.

Four Seasons recording
A remake of the song by The Four Seasons charted in 1964, reaching its peak Billboard Hot 100 position at No. 28, on July 18. "Alone (Why Must I Be Alone)" also went to No. 8 on the Canadian singles chart. It was the act's last hit single on Vee Jay Records, as The Four Seasons had already left the label at the beginning of 1964 in a royalty dispute.

Cover versions
"Alone" was one of a number of hits for Petula Clark, reaching No. 8 on the UK Singles Chart, before she became famous internationally.
The song was also subsequently recorded by Tracey Ullman.
A 1957, version by The Southlanders, reached No. 17 in the UK.
Saint Motel sampled the original version in their song "Sisters" which appears on their third album, The Original Motion Picture Soundtrack.

References

1957 singles
1964 singles
Petula Clark songs
The Four Seasons (band) songs
Vee-Jay Records singles
Song recordings produced by Bob Crewe
1957 songs